Oralovo is a rural locality (a village) in Krasnovishersky District, Perm Krai, Russia. The population was 2 as of 2010. There is 1 street.

Geography 
Oralovo is located 19 km northwest of Krasnovishersk (the district's administrative centre) by road. Krasnovishersk is the nearest rural locality.

References 

Rural localities in Krasnovishersky District